Azzeddine Ourahou (born 12 August 1984) is a Moroccan footballer.

Ourahou played for Nîmes Olympique and FC Istres in France's Ligue 1 and Ligue 2.

He was part of the Moroccan 2004 Olympic football team, which exited in the first round, finishing third in group D, behind group winners Iraq and runners-up Costa Rica.

References

External links
 
 
 
 

1984 births
Living people
Moroccan footballers
Association football midfielders
Nîmes Olympique players
FC Istres players
Olympic footballers of Morocco
Footballers at the 2004 Summer Olympics